Kallik or Kalik or Kolik may refer to:
 Kallik, Hamadan
 Kalik, Kermanshah
 Kalik, Nowshahr, Mazandaran Province
 Kolik, Nur, Mazandaran Province
 Kallik, Sistan and Baluchestan
 Kalik, West Azerbaijan
 Kolik, West Azerbaijan

See also

 Kalik
Karlik (disambiguation)